Marie Howe (born 1950 Rochester, New York) is an American poet. 
Her most recent poetry collection is Magdalene (W.W. Norton, 2017). 
In August 2012 she was named the State Poet for New York.

Early life
Howe is the second eldest of nine children.  She attended Sacred Heart Convent School and earned her undergraduate degree from the University of Windsor.

Career
She worked briefly as a newspaper reporter in Rochester and as a high school English teacher in Massachusetts. Howe did not devote serious attention to writing poetry until she turned 30. At the suggestion of an instructor in a writers' workshop, Howe applied to and was accepted at Columbia University where she studied with Stanley Kunitz and received her M.F.A. in 1983.

She has taught writing at Tufts University and Warren Wilson College. She is presently on the writing faculties at Columbia University, Sarah Lawrence College, and New York University.

Her first book, The Good Thief, was selected by Margaret Atwood as the winner of the 1987 Open Competition of the National Poetry Series. In 1998, she published her best-known book of poems, What the Living Do; the title poem in the collection is a haunting lament for her brother with the plain-spoken last line: "I am living, I remember you."

Howe's brother John died of an AIDS-related illness in 1989. "John’s living and dying changed my aesthetic entirely," she has said.  
In 1995, Howe co-edited, with Michael Klein, a collection of essays, letters, and stories entitled In the Company of My Solitude: American Writing from the AIDS Pandemic.

Her poems have appeared in literary journals and magazines including The New Yorker, The Atlantic, Poetry, Agni, Ploughshares, and Harvard Review. Her honors include National Endowment for the Arts and Guggenheim fellowships.

In January 2018, Howe was elected a Chancellor of the Academy of American Poets.

Literary themes and style 

Marie Howe is praised for her poetry which captures the metaphysical and spiritual dimensions of everyday life . Her work explores the nature of the soul and the self through literary themes of life, death, love, pain, hope, despair, sin, virtue, solitude, community, impermanence, and the eternal. Despite the strong themes in her writing, Howe subtly expresses these messages through the explanation of daily tasks and regular lifestyles in most of her poems.

Her first collection, The Good Thief (1988), was made philosophical and reflective with the incorporation of Biblical and mythical allusions. Margaret Atwood, who chose this book for the National Poetry Series, praised Howe’s “poems of obsession that transcend their own dark roots.” Additionally, Stanley Kunitz noted, “Her long, deep-breathing lines address the mysteries of flesh and spirit, in terms accessible only to a woman who is very much of our time and yet still in touch with the sacred.” Such an esteemed review justified the selection of The Good Thief for the Lavan Younger Poets Prize from the American Academy of Poets.

A year after the publication of her first poetry book (1989), Howe’s brother John died from AIDS. According to Howe in an AGNI interview, “John’s living and dying changed my aesthetic completely.” Consequently in 1997, she published a second collection, What the Living Do, as an elegy for John which reflected a new style. Stripped of metaphors, her writing was described as “a transparent, accessible documentary of loss” by the Poetry of Foundation.

In 2008, Howe distanced herself from the personal narrative and returned to the spiritual style in The Kingdom of Ordinary Time. This is most representative of Howe’s style now, a balance between the ordinary and unordinary. It is best put by playwright Eve Ensler, who describes her poems as “a guide to living on the brink of the mystical and the mundane.”

Honors and awards
 1998 Guggenheim Fellowship
 1992 National Endowment for the Arts Fellowship
 2015 Academy of American Poets Fellowship
 2017 Robert Creeley Award

Published works
Poetry Collections
  
  
 
 The Good Thief (Persea Books, 1988) 

Anthologies
 In the Company of My Solitude: American Writing from the AIDS Pandemic, (ed., with Michael Klein, Persea Books, 1995)

References

Sources
 Library of Congress Online Catalog > Marie Howe

External links
 Marie Howe's Official Website
 Author's Booking Agency > Blue Flower Arts > Marie Howe Author Page
 Marie Howe: Poems and Profile on Poets.org
 Poem: The New Yorker > January 14, 2008 > The Star Market by Marie Howe
 Poem: A Little Poetry > How Some of It Happened by Marie Howe
 Personal Essay: O: The Oprah Magazine > Memoir by Marie Howe: Not to Look Away
 Video: PBS > Poetry Everywhere > Marie Howe Reading The Gate
 
 Interview: Bomb Magazine > #61, Fall 1997 > Marie Howe Interviewed by Victoria Redel
 Poet Marie Howe On 'What The Living Do' After Loss, NPR, October 19, 2011

1950 births
Living people
Sarah Lawrence College faculty
New York University faculty
Columbia University School of the Arts alumni
Writers from Rochester, New York
Poets from New York (state)
National Endowment for the Arts Fellows
The New Yorker people
Poets Laureate of New York (state)
American women poets
20th-century American poets
20th-century American women writers
21st-century American poets
21st-century American women writers
American women academics